Vojtěch or Vojtech is a, respectively, Czech and Slovak given name of Slavic origin. It is composed of two parts: voj – "troops"/"war(rior)" and těch – "consolator"/"rejoicing man". So, the name could be interpreted either as "consolator of troops" or "man rejoicing in a battle, warlike man". The name day is 23 April.

The name Vojtěch is since the Early Middle Ages also perceived as the equivalent of Germanic name Adalbert ("noble bright"), due to the saint Adalbert of Prague, however, the two names have no linguistic relationship with each other. Via the same artificial process have been the names Vojtěch/Adalbert assigned to Hungarian name Béla (like "noble").

Use in Czech 
The proper Czech spelling of the name is 'Vojtěch', pronounced . The name contains two Czech orthography elements. The first is the caron, which is a form of a diacritical mark, over the letter 'e'. The caron modifies the pronunciation of the letter 't' immediately preceding the ě. The second is a digraph at the end of the name: the last two letters 'ch' in fact form a single phoneme (pronounced as a voiceless velar fricative ). (The pair 'ch' is the only formal digraph in the Czech alphabet.)

A common shorter version of the name is Vojta, pronounced . According to a 2009 survey of the Czech Ministry of Interior, there were over 41 thousand men with the first name Vojtěch in the Czech Republic, which made it the 28th most used name on Czech territory.

Use in Slovak 
The name is spelled without the caron above the letter e.

Foreign variants 
 Polish: Wojciech, Wojtas, Wojtasek, Wojtak, Wojtek, Wojtczak, Wojcik, Wojcicki, Wojt, Wojteczek, Wojtuś.
 Serbian: Воjтех / Vojteh
 Croatian: Vojtjeh
 German: Woitke, Witke, Voitke, Voytke, Woytke, Vogtke, Wogtke, Woetke, Wötke, Wotke, Woyzeck, Wozzeck
 American: Watke

Given name 
 Saint Adalbert of Prague (~956–997), Bishop of Prague, the first recorded user of this name
 Vojtěch Adam (born 1950), Czech politician
 Vojtech Alexander (1857–1916), Slovak radiologist
 Vojta Beneš (1878–1951), Czechoslovak educator, political leader and brother of Edvard Beneš
 Vojtěch Dobiáš (born 2000), Czech ice hockey player
 Vojtěch Filip (born 1955), Czech politician
 Alberto Vojtěch Frič (1882–1944), Czech botanist and ethnographer
 Vojtěch Jarník (1897–1970), Czech mathematician
 Vojtěch Jasný (born 1925), Czech director
 Vojtěch Kubašta (1914-1992), Czech artist and illustrator
 Vojtěch Machek (born 1990), Czech footballer
 Vojtech Milošovič (born 1992), Czech footballer
 Vojtěch Náprstek (1826–1894), Czech journalist
 Vojtech Plat (born 1994), Czech chess grandmaster
 Vojtěch Preissig (1873–1944), Czech type designer
 Vojtěch Šafařík (1829–1902), Czech chemist
 Vojtech Tuka (1880–1946), Slovak prime minister
 Vojtech Zamarovský (1919–2006), Slovak writer
 Vojtěch Matyáš Jírovec (Adalbert Gyrowetz) (1763–1850) Bohemian composer.

Surname 
 Adam Vojtěch, Czech singer and minister of health
 Adolf Vojta-Jurný, Czech actor
 Alexandr Vojta, Czech director of documents
 Billy Vojtek (born 1943), Australian soccer player
 Elmer Voight (born Elemír Vojtko), American golfer of Slovak origin and father of actor Jon Voight
 Hermína Vojtová, Czech actress
 Ivan Vojtek, Slovak actor
 Jaroslav Vojta (1888–1970), Czech actor
 Jaroslav Vojtek, Slovak director
 Jiří Vojta, Czech actor
 Josef Vojtek, Czech musician
 Josef Vojtech (born 1925), Austrian weightlifter
 Linda Vojtová (born 1985), Czech model
 Martin Vojtek (born 1975), Czech ice hockey player
 Roman Vojtek, Czech actor
 Václav Vojta (1917–2000), Czech physician (inventor of the Vojta method)

See also
 Wojciech, a Polish variant
 Béla
 Slavic names

References

Slavic masculine given names
Czech masculine given names
Slovak masculine given names